The 2022–23 Logan Cup is the 29th edition of the Logan Cup, a first-class cricket competition in Zimbabwe, which started on 24 November 2022. Twenty matches are scheduled to be played, with the tournament concluding on 17 February 2023. The Matabeleland Tuskers are the defending champions.

The season was marred by the mid-season death of Southern Rocks head coach Shepherd Makunura, who died from a long-standing illness on 15 December 2022.

Points table

Match Summary 
The total team points at the end of each round are listed.

Fixtures

Round 1

Round 2

Round 3

Round 4

Round 5

Round 6

Round 7

Round 8

Round 9

Round 10

References

External links
 Series home at ESPNcricinfo

Logan Cup
Logan Cup
Logan Cup
Logan Cup